Inverness is a city in Citrus County, Florida, United States. As of the 2020 census, the population was 7,543. It is the county seat of Citrus County and is home to the Citrus County Courthouse and near the  Flying Eagle Preserve.

Geography
Inverness is located in eastern Citrus County, on the western shore of the connected Tsala Apopka and Henderson lakes.

Climate
Inverness has a humid subtropical climate (Cfa), typical of the southeastern United States, with hot, humid, summers and mild, mainly dry winters.

History 
Archaeological digs showed that the Seminole resided in the area that is now Inverness. The Seminole leader Osceola made his wartime camp, known as Powell's Town, in the area during the Second Seminole War. 

The city of Inverness was originally named "Tompkinsville." White settlement of the area dates back to 1868. Tompkins, later known as "Uncle Alf", started the community. To attract newcomers to the town, he established a mail service and helped erect the first sawmill in the county. He gave his brother-in-law, Frank M. Dampier Sr., a lot to build a store, with Dampier becoming the first merchant in town. Dampier is credited with laying out the town and naming it Tompkinsville.

Not many years later, the town of Tompkinsville was sold to a firm in Jacksonville, and the name was changed to "Inverness". According to the late historian Mary McRae of Homosassa, Inverness is named directly after a Scottish city of the same name. Inverness is Great Britain's most northerly city, and "the capital of the Highlands", with a population of 46,870. The story goes that Inverness, Florida got its name from a lonely Scotsman, far away from his home, who gazed upon the blue waters of the Native American-named Tsala Apopka Lake and thought the area looked like the headlands and lochs of the area surrounding Inverness in Scotland. Inver is a Gaelic word meaning "mouth of the river", the River Ness flows through the Scottish city Inverness, so Inverness literally means the mouth of the River Ness, which flows from Loch Ness, which is one of Scotland's most visited areas. Since the Florida city lies at the foot of one of the chain of lakes in Citrus County, Inverness seemed an appropriate name. 

According to official city documentation, Inverness was incorporated on March 6, 1919.

Over twelve downtown buildings have been recognized by the historic plaque program and are presently active places for business. Central Business Development grants have helped to retain the historic character of the city. In 1961 the historic courthouse downtown was used to film the courtroom scene of "Follow That Dream", featuring Elvis Presley.

The city has been designated a "Gateway Community" by the Florida Trail Association. Since 1995, Inverness has been recognized as a Tree City USA by the National Arbor Day Foundation and the US Forest Service. In 2009, Inverness was named "City of the Year" by the Forty and Eight, a national veterans' organization.

Events
The last full weekend in October is reserved for the Great American Cooter Festival, named after the Florida cooter turtle. A family-focused event of music, games, crafts and more is held at the adjoining Liberty and Wallace Brooks parks on Lake Henderson.

Since 1971, the first weekend in November marks the Festival of the Arts, a juried fine art show that has grown to include over 100 artists. 

Every year in March, there is a Seminole War re-enactment at Fort Cooper State Park called Fort Cooper Days.

The Great American Cooter Festival has since been replaced with the Inverness Country Jam as of 2022 which takes place on the last weekend of October.

Demographics

As of the 2020 census, Inverness had a population of 7,543 with 3,664 households. There were 1.92 persons per household. 83.6% of people lived in the same house as one year prior. 3.8% of the population 5 years and older spoke a language other than English at home. 

By race, the population was split with 89.7% white, 4.9% black or African American, 0.3% American Indian or Alaska Native, 3.1% Asian, 2.0% two or more races, and 5.4% Hispanic or Latino. There were 856 veterans residing in the city and 3.1% of the population were foreign born persons. 

The median value of owner-occupied housing units was $120,100. The median selected monthly owner costs with a mortgage was $882 and the median selected monthly owner costs without a mortgage was $324. The median gross rent was $842. The median household income was $39,532 and the per capita income was $24,585. 15.8% of the population lived below the poverty threshold. 

86.0% of the households had a computer and 81.3% of households had a broadband internet subscription. 90.9% of the population 25 years and older were high school graduates or higher and 15.1% of that same population had a Bachelor’s degree or higher. 

Of the population that was under 65 years old, 11.0% lived with a disability and 13.5% of that same population were without health insurance.

Transportation and recreation
The Citrus County Sheriff's Office's aviation unit operates from this airport.

U.S. Route 41 is the main north-south road through Inverness, leading north  to Dunnellon and south  to Brooksville. The main east-west road is State Road 44, leading west  to Crystal River and east  to Interstate 75 near Wildwood. The two roads join to form Inverness' Main Street from Talmage Avenue to Highland Boulevard. Other county roads include County Road 581 and County Road 470.

 
Inverness is home to the Lakes Region Library, which is part of the Citrus County Library System. The library offers several recreational classes such as Tai Chi, painting, gardening, basic technology usage, children and teen programs, and more. Times and services are listed on the library's website. 

The Withlacoochee State Trail, which replaced a former Atlantic Coast Line Railroad line, runs between two of the chained lakes, with small bridges replacing former railroad trestle crossings. The trail offers access to 46 continuous miles of enjoyment for biking, jogging and walking. It is the longest paved recreation trail in Florida. The Inverness trailhead can be found on North Apopka Avenue (CR 470) across from the trail crossing and Liberty Park.

Other parks in Inverness include Wallace Brooks Park, Whispering Pines Park, the Henderson Lake boat ramps, and Fort Cooper State Park, just south of the city. Inverness is also close to Withlapopka Community Park, the almost  Flying Eagle Preserve and the almost  McGregor Smith Scout Reservation.

Government
Inverness utilizes a council–manager form of government with a city council composed of the mayor of Inverness and five councilmembers. This council also sets policy to be administered, directed, and implemented by the city manager. As of February 2020, the current mayor is Bob Plaisted and the current city manager is Eric Williams.

Education
The city is served by Citrus County Schools. Residents are divided between Inverness Primary, Pleasant Grove Elementary, and Hernando Elementary. All residents are zoned to Inverness Middle School, and Citrus High School.

The Lakes Region Library of Citrus Libraries is in Inverness.

References

Further reading
 Dunn, Hampton. Back Home: A History of Citrus County, Florida. Inverness, FL, 1976
 Rooks, Justine. "Remember When." Citrus County Chronicle, August 1, 1998.

External links

 
 Inverness Country Jam
 Inverness at Citrus County Visitors and Convention Bureau

1868 establishments in Florida
Cities in Citrus County, Florida
Cities in Florida
County seats in Florida
Populated places established in 1868